Yang Zi (born 19 June 1984, in Beijing, China) is a Chinese-born Singaporean former table tennis player.

Career 
Yang joined the Singapore Table Tennis Association under the Foreign Sports Talent Scheme in 2003 and became a Singapore citizen two years later in 2005. He had represented Singapore in many major events such as 15th Asian Games, 18th Commonwealth Games and 23rd SEA Games.

In 2005, Yang won 2 Pro Tour Men's Singles U21 titles and won the Pro Tour Grand Finals Men's Singles U21 title. He also won the silver medal in the Beijing Invitational. Later he also managed to clinch 3 gold medals in the 2005 Southeast Asian Games and 2 golds in the 2006 Commonwealth Games. During the world's second largest sports event, 15th Asian Games, Yang, together with partner Li Jiawei, won the bronze medal for the mixed doubles event. Yang and his doubles partner, Gao Ning, has also won many medals in the ITTF Pro Tour Events.

At the 2008 Summer Olympics, Yang made it to the 4th round losing to Zoran Primorac of Croatia by a score of 4–2, however managing to defeat Marcos Freitas(POR) and Chuang Chih-yuan(TPE) in the 2nd and 3rd rounds respectively.

At the 2012 Summer Olympics, Yang lost to Paul Drinkhall in the second round, but he fared much better in the team event, where Singapore reached the quarterfinals, where they lost to eventual gold medalists, China.

At the 2014 Commonwealth Games, Yang and Jian Zhan won the bronze medal in the men's doubles, defeating Drinkhall and Liam Pitchford of England in the bronze medal match. Yang also won the gold medal in the team event.

In 2017, Yang announced his retirement.

Medals

Achievements
2009
ITTF Pro Tour German Open
Men's Doubles – 3rd 
ITTF Pro Tour Indian Open
Men's Singles – 3rd
Men's Doubles – 1st 
2008
ITTF Pro Tour Grand Finals
Men's Doubles – Gold (with Gao Ning)
Beijing Olympic Games
Round of 16
ITTF Pro Tour China Open
Men's Team – Top 4 (with Gao Ning, Cai Xiaoli)
ITTF Pro Tour Chile Open
Men's Doubles – 1st (Gao Ning)
2007
24th SEA Games
Men's Team – Gold (with Gao Ning, Cai Xiaoli)
Men's Doubles – Gold (with Gao Ning)
Mixed Doubles – Gold (Li Jiawei)
ITTF Pro Tour Sweden Open
Men's Doubles – 2nd (with Gao Ning)
ITTF Pro Tour German Open
Men's Doubles – 2nd (with Gao Ning)
ITTF Pro Tour French Open
Men's Doubles – Top 4 (with Gao Ning)
ITTF Pro Tour Austria Open
Men's Doubles – 1st (with Gao Ning)
ITTF Pro Tour Taipei Open
Men's Doubles – 2nd (with Gao Ning)
ITTF Pro Tour Japan Open
Men's Doubles – Top 4 (with Gao Ning)
ITTF Pro Tour Korea Open
Men's Doubles – 2nd (with Gao Ning)
17th Commonwealth Championships, India, Jaipur
Men's Team – Gold
Men's Singles – Silver
Men's Doubles – Silver (with Gao Ning)
Mixed Doubles – Gold (with Wang Yuegu)
ITTF Pro Tour Chille Open
Men's Singles – Top 4
Men's Doubles – 2nd (with Gao Ning)
ITTF Pro Tour Brazilian Open
Men's Doubles – 2nd (with Gao Ning)
ITTF Pro Tour Indian Open
Men's Doubles – 1st (with Gao Ning)
ITTF Pro Tour Taipei Open
Men's Doubles – 2nd (with Gao Ning)

References

External links
 
 Singapore Table Tennis Association
 International Table Tennis Federation

Living people
1984 births
Table tennis players from Beijing
Chinese emigrants to Singapore
Singaporean sportspeople of Chinese descent
Naturalised citizens of Singapore
Naturalised table tennis players
Chinese male table tennis players
Singaporean male table tennis players
Commonwealth Games gold medallists for Singapore
Commonwealth Games silver medallists for Singapore
Commonwealth Games bronze medallists for Singapore
Table tennis players at the 2006 Commonwealth Games
Table tennis players at the 2010 Commonwealth Games
Olympic table tennis players of Singapore
Table tennis players at the 2008 Summer Olympics
Table tennis players at the 2012 Summer Olympics
Place of birth missing (living people)
Asian Games medalists in table tennis
Table tennis players at the 2010 Asian Games
Table tennis players at the 2006 Asian Games
Table tennis players at the 2014 Commonwealth Games
Table tennis players at the 2014 Asian Games
Asian Games bronze medalists for Singapore
Commonwealth Games medallists in table tennis
Medalists at the 2006 Asian Games
Southeast Asian Games medalists in table tennis
Southeast Asian Games gold medalists for Singapore
Southeast Asian Games silver medalists for Singapore
Southeast Asian Games bronze medalists for Singapore
Competitors at the 2005 Southeast Asian Games
Competitors at the 2007 Southeast Asian Games
Competitors at the 2009 Southeast Asian Games
Medallists at the 2010 Commonwealth Games
Medallists at the 2014 Commonwealth Games